WTSJ-LD (channel 38) is a low-power television station in Milwaukee, Wisconsin, United States, owned by Innovate Corp. The station's transmitter is located at the Milwaukee PBS tower on North Humboldt Boulevard in Milwaukee's Estabrook Park neighborhood.

History

Early license establishment
WTSJ-LD has its origins in a construction permit for a low-power television station on channel 55 in Ludington, Michigan, which the Federal Communications Commission (FCC) granted to Richard L. Bourassa on May 31, 1995 and issued the call sign W55CG. Bourassa sold the station to MS Communications on November 16, 2000. A month later, MS filed for a license to cover the permit, which was granted on February 16, 2001; on May 24, the company obtained a construction permit to move the station to channel 53 in Milwaukee as W53CC. The channel 53 permit was subsequently replaced with one for operation on channel 38 (as W38DT) on April 14, 2004. MS Communications had plans to establish wireless cable networks, but never broadcast anything other than test patterns on its stations.

Bustos era with Azteca
Bustos Media purchased the station from MS Communications for $1,350,000 on June 9, 2006. MS had shut down the W55CG facility in Ludington on the previous day in preparation for the completion of the sale. Bustos changed the call letters to WBWT-LP on August 30, 2006, built the channel 38 facility in Milwaukee, began airing a test pattern in September 2006, and officially signed WBWT-LP on the air on December 12. The station originally served as an affiliate of Azteca América and also initially carried a video simulcast of the morning program from sister radio station WDDW (104.7 FM). It expected to add additional local programming to serve Milwaukee's Hispanic community. Time Warner Cable began carrying the station throughout its service area in October 2009 on digital cable channel 807.

Bustos filed for a construction permit with the FCC to build digital transmitter facilities on UHF channel 31 in 2010. In September of that year, Bustos transferred most of its licenses to Adelante Media Group as part of a settlement with its lenders.

Switch to MundoFox
On July 25, 2012, Adalante announced that it had signed an affiliation agreement to switch its Azteca America affiliates to upstart Spanish-language network MundoFox, which officially launched on August 13. However, WBWT-LP switched to the network two weeks earlier on August 1 during its unadvertised soft launch period. Azteca's national feed was eventually picked up by Time Warner and Charter.

Adalante sold WBWT-LP, along with KBTU-LP in Salt Lake City, to DTV America Corporation for $425,000 on July 16, 2015. On October 20, DTV America changed the station's call letters to WTSJ-LP; the calls stand for the initials of their print media partner The Spanish Journal, Milwaukee's leading Hispanic-American publication.

DTV America era; going digital, return to Azteca, and additional networks
Around the time of the sale to DTV America, the station launched their digital signal on channel 38 via a flash cut. In addition to MundoMax on 38.1, WTSJ-LP resumed their affiliation with Azteca on 38.2, with both signals transmitting in 720p. With the move of WTSJ-LP to digital operations, it was the last station in the Milwaukee market to end analog operations. Despite ending analog operations, the station continues to utilize LP calls for the time being. Slowly, DTV America began to establish their common template of having multiple subchannel networks on one signal seen in other markets.

In December 2015, Azteca was replaced with Buzzr and the feed was converted to 480p.

On May 5, 2016, the station launched a third subchannel for the Katz Broadcasting network Escape in lieu of WTMJ-TV, which agreed to carry the network through their parent company E. W. Scripps in 2015, but was unable to at the time due to a lack of space for new subchannels. In June 2016, the station added QVC's "Plus" feed on Channel 38.4, duplicating the same signal found on WIWN-DT5 in the market.

In late October 2016, WTSJ-LP again resumed carrying Azteca on their main channel, its third affiliation round with the network, as the moribund MundoMax network began to wind down operations. In addition, a fifth subchannel carrying The Country Network was added. This returned that network to Milwaukee after a year-long absence, since WCGV-TV had dropped it from their second subchannel for Comet along with the AccuWeather Channel on a seventh subchannel (using the national feed without local conditions). Eventually the sixth subchannel was filled by Tuff TV, and all three subchannels were sorted into a new mapping, with AccuWeather currently on DT5, followed by Tuff on DT6 and The Country Network on DT7.

With WTMJ ending their carriage of Cozi TV at the start of 2017, WTSJ-LP dropped Escape in the month before as WTMJ picked it up in its place. WTSJ-LP3 was left vacant with a paid programming loop until January 15, 2017, when WTSJ-LP completed the exchange and added Cozi TV. On June 22, 2017, WIWN (channel 68) also began to carry Cozi over their main signal. That station is officially listed by Nielsen as being in the Green Bay market owing to its city of license of Fond du Lac, Wisconsin, but it has all of its coverage in the Milwaukee market, resulting in the unusual situation of two stations under different ownerships from the same tower carrying the same network. On July 27, 2017, Cozi TV became exclusive to WIWN, with Jewelry Television taking over WTSJ-LP3.

With HC2 Holdings' mid-2017 acquisition of DTV America and the November 2017 acquisition of Azteca, the station is now an O&O of their main network, effectively stabilizing its main channel's programming for the foreseeable future. With the repeal of the Main Studio Rule in 2019, the station's studio and office on South 108th Street in West Allis was closed, and it is now centralcased out of HC2's programming hub with no local presence. 

Tuff TV suddenly terminated their national operations on August 26, 2018, and currently paid programming runs on that signal. Accuweather was replaced with the Christian Broadcasting Network's new 24-hour news channel on October 1, with WTSJ-LP a charter affiliate of the network. Christian Broadcasting Network was replaced by LX on May 22, 2019.

On October 25, 2019, WTSJ-LP went temporarily silent as an after effect of the operators and engineers of the Milwaukee PBS tower adjusting the tower's various antennas before and after the market's October 18, 2019 FCC-required frequency shifts involving the spectrum auction. WTSJ-LP also shifted to a post-repack channel of channel 26 and when it did, took an "LD" channel suffix.

Azteca America discontinued operations on December 31, 2022, with HC2 replacing it with Timeless TV, a network run by Burlington-based Canella Media. By the next month, Spanish programming had returned to the station's main channel, and it now carries the Visión Latina network.

Subchannels
The station's digital channel is multiplexed:

References

External links
History of Milwaukee television

Buzzr affiliates
LX (TV network) affiliates
TSJ-LD
Television channels and stations established in 2006
2006 establishments in Wisconsin
Spanish-language television stations in Wisconsin
Innovate Corp.
Low-power television stations in the United States